Kovarikia, is a genus of scorpion belonging to the family Scorpionidae. All described species are restricted to humid rocky microhabitats of  southern California. Three species identified.

Major identification is from unique neobothriotaxy found on the ventral surface of the pedipalp chelae. A secondary lamellar hook found on the hemispermatophore. Mating plug barb, is crescent shaped.

Species
Kovarikia angelena (Gertsch & Soleglad, 1972)
Kovarikia bogerti (Gertsch & Soleglad, 1972)
Kovarikia williamsi (Gertsch & Soleglad, 1972)

References

Vaejovidae